Armin Tashakori (born 8 December 1986, in Hamedan) is an Iranian volleyball player who plays for Matin Varamin and  Iran men's national volleyball team.

Honours

National team
Asian Championship
 2013 Dubai
Asian Games
 2014 Incheon
Military World Games
 2011 Tehran

Club 

 2011-2012  Iranian Runner-up with Saipa Karaj
 2015-2016  Iranian Third place with Shahrdari Urmia
 2016-2017  Iranian Third place with Shahrdari Urmia
 2019-2020  Iranian Runner-up with Saipa Tehran

Individual 

 Best middle blocker: 2011 Rio World Military Games

References

External links 

 FIVB profile
 

People from Hamadan
Iranian men's volleyball players
1986 births
Living people
Asian Games gold medalists for Iran
Asian Games medalists in volleyball
Volleyball players at the 2014 Asian Games
Medalists at the 2014 Asian Games
21st-century Iranian people